The Maratha Warriors was a club in the defunct Premier Hockey League.

Maratha Warriors may also refer to:
 Maratha Warriors (IVL Club), a club in the Indian Volley League
 Warriors of the Maratha Empire